BIXI Montréal is a public bicycle sharing system serving Montréal, Quebec, Canada.

Launched in May 2009 by Public Bike System Company (PBSC), it is North America's first large-scale bike sharing system and the original BIXI brand of systems. PBSC filed for bankruptcy at the beginning of 2014 as the company started experiencing financial difficulties in late 2013. The city of Montreal then bought PBSC's assets for $11.9 million in February 2014 and created BIXI Montréal, a non-profit entity to run the bike sharing operations. Following the purchase of the company's international division by Bruno Rodi in April 2014, it was renamed PBSC Urban Solutions. After buying a large number of Rodi's shares, Luc Sabbatini became PBSC's majority stockholder and current CEO.

The name

BIXI is a hybrid between "Bicycle" and "Taxi" to underline the concept of being able to use a bicycle just like a taxi.  The name was coined by Michel Gourdeau who won a public competition to find the best name for the service when it was first introduced in Montreal.  The prize for the winner was a BIXI pass for life.

System components

A complete station is made up of a pay station, bikes, and bike docks (where the bikes are kept), which are fitted into modular platforms that are powered by solar panels.  These platforms are the base and electronic ports for pay stations and bike docks. Bike stations can be created, expanded, configured and removed in about half an hour, monitored by a real-time management system. Excavation or preparatory work is not required, allowing the installation of a bike station as an addition to on-street parking.

Bike dock and locking system

Bike docks are used to store and lock bikes. These modular docking stations are formed by a combination of groups of four docks. The bike dock's modularity allows a pay station to be used in the place of a single dock. Maintenance and repair of the system is simple because of a removable module present in every docking station which contains the locking system and all necessary parts that allow the system to function. In case of repairs, this module can be replaced with an identical one immediately, reducing the down-time of the system. The locking system is based on an energy efficient motor used in the medical sector. The principal inventor of these systems is Charles Khairallah, president of Robotics Design,
with co-inventor Michel Dallaire, president of Michel Dallaire Industrial Design.

Pay station
Users can rent a bike using a subscriber key (a "BIXI key") obtained through a long-term online subscription (30 days or annual) or an access code provided by the pay station (24-hour or 72-hour access). Pay stations are touchscreen-operated and only accept credit cards. A button is used to notify BIXI mechanics of bicycles requiring servicing.

The bike

The bicycles are utility bicycles with a unisex step-through frame and three gears.

The one-piece aluminum frame and handlebars hide cables in an effort to protect them from tampering and harsh weather conditions. The heavy-duty tires are designed to be puncture-resistant and are filled with nitrogen gas to maintain proper pressure for longer. White LED lights are found in the front of the bike. The bikes are built in Saguenay, Quebec, by Cycles Devinci.

Subscriptions
In order to use the system, users need to take out a subscription, which allows the subscriber an unlimited number of rentals under 30 minutes for 1 day and 3 days subscriptions, and 45 minutes for 1 month and 1 year subscriptions.  A trip that lasts longer than this no-charge time period gets additional charges, on an increasing price scale. The increasing price scale is meant to keep the bikes in circulation.

Development

Stationnement de Montréal
The project was included in the transportation plan for the City of Montreal, which aimed at encouraging active means of transportation such as bicycle. The program is run by the city's parking authority, Stationnement de Montréal.

Other developers
8D Technologies developed the entire technological platform behind the BIXI system, including the wireless bike station terminals, the RFID bike dock technology and all software systems. The system runs on solar energy to reduce environmental impact and maximize the system's overall energy efficiency. 8D also created the Spotcycle bike-share smartphone app that locates and shows the status of bike stations close to the users.
Michel Dallaire created the design of the physical components.
Robotics Design created the modular bike dock and the intelligent locking system.
Cycles Devinci manufactures BIXI bikes in the Saguenay-Lac-Saint-Jean region of Quebec.
Rio Tinto Alcan is the title sponsor of the BIXI program, as well as providing aluminium for the bikes.
Morrow Communications.
Michel Gourdeau: suggested the name BIXI, a portmanteau of bicycle and taxi, which was selected 8 896 suggestions by a majority of the people who participated in a contest organized by the city of Montreal in the autumn of 2008.

Station network
The location of a BIXI bike station is determined by several parameters, including population density, points of interest and activities (universities), bike paths, other transportation networks, and data on travel patterns of the general public. In 2009, 5,000 bikes were deployed in Montreal through a network of pay stations located mainly in the boroughs of Rosemont–La Petite-Patrie, the Plateau-Mont-Royal and Ville-Marie, spilling over into parts of Outremont and the South West. , the system has spread to Hochelaga-Maisonneuve, Villeray–Saint-Michel–Parc-Extension, Ahuntsic, Côte-des-Neiges–Notre-Dame-de-Grâce, Westmount, Saint-Leonard, Verdun, and Old Longueuil.

Difficulties

Montreal's BIXI system experienced some initial difficulties less than two months after its introduction in 2009, with damage and vandalism to some of the bikes. The La Presse newspaper reported on July 5, 2009, that one in five bikes had been damaged and 15% of bike racks had become defective. Stationnement de Montréal communications director Michel Philibert stated that the organization planned to reinforce racks and was testing prototype designs. Designer Michel Dallaire said it never occurred to him that people would try to break the stations to steal bikes. Since then, there has been no significant damage or vandalism issues reported in any of the BIXI installations.

The program experienced several serious setbacks and obstacles during its lifetime, including program mismanagement, breach of contract litigation, and the surmounting of debt, most notably when the city of Montreal was forced to sell the lucrative international division, eliminating from the equation the only part that turned a profit. Eventually, this contributed to the company filing for bankruptcy in January 2014. The international division was renamed PBSC Urban Solutions and continued to extend its activities in several countries including United States, Canada and Mexico.

In popular culture
 The Montreal rap group Da Gryptions had a viral hit song and video in the summer of 2010 titled "The Bixi Anthem" which was a tribute to the bike system.

See also
PBSC Urban Solutions
Bicycle-sharing system
List of bicycle sharing systems
Utility cycling - Short-term hire schemes

References

External links

 Official website
 

Community bicycle programs
Transport in Montreal
Cycling in Canada
2009 establishments in Quebec
Bicycle sharing in Canada